Bloomberg Radio is a radio service of Bloomberg L.P. that provides global business news programming 24 hours a day. The format is general and financial news, offering local, national and international news reports along with financial market updates and interviews with corporate executives, economists and industry analysts. On off hours, local stations may preempt with local sports play-by-play coverage such as college basketball, tennis and other sports coverage.

Bloomberg Radio is broadcast on radio stations around the United States, and directly operates five radio stations:

WBBR 1130 AM in New York City.
WRCA 1330 AM in Watertown-Boston and WNBP 1450 AM Newburyport-Boston along with two FM translators at 106.1 MHz.
KNEW 960 AM in Oakland-San Francisco, along with the HD Radio digital subchannel on 103.7 KOSF-HD2.
WDCH-FM 99.1 FM in Bowie, Maryland, serving Washington, D.C. and Baltimore.

In 1992, Bloomberg purchased the first of these, WBBR 1130 AM in New York (at the time using the call sign WNEW), for $13.5 million. Bloomberg took over the operation of WXKS (1200 AM) in Newton, Massachusetts, (serving Boston) on March 1, 2013. The following year, Bloomberg began programming KNEW on September 29, 2014. Both stations are owned and operated by iHeartMedia, Inc., but are programmed by Bloomberg Radio under a local marketing agreement (LMA).  On December 21, 2015, Bloomberg Radio launched a similar arrangement on CBS Radio-owned WNEW-FM, its first FM radio station. The call letters of WNEW-FM were later changed to WDCH-FM and the station is now owned by Entercom. On July 4, 2017, Bloomberg moved its programming in Boston to WRCA, owned by Beasley Media Group.  Later that year, it fully acquired WNBP 1450 AM in Newburyport to serve as a simulcast of WRCA.  Both WRCA and WNBP operate translator stations on 106.1 FM.  Its LMA with WXKS expired on March 1, 2018. Bloomberg Radio is also heard nationally on Sirius XM satellite radio channel 119. Select programming is also broadcast in London UK on DAB digital radio via the London 3 multiplex (VHF block 11B), with simulcasts of the Bloomberg TV audio at other times.

Programming
The original Bloomberg Radio news format divided each hour of the day into three 20-minute segments, each of which contained stock market updates, business headlines, traffic, weather, local news/sports, a human interest piece or a general update about cultural happenings. However, by 2010, Bloomberg Radio had shifted from a headline service to a discussion-based format in order to offer more in-depth market and economic analysis. Bloomberg Radio is the world's only global business radio service. Bloomberg Daybreak Asia broadcasts live from New York and Hong Kong, Sunday through Thursday 6:00 p.m. to 10:00 p.m. ET (morning drive time in Asian time zones.) It is then followed by Bloomberg Daybreak Europe, originating from London, on Monday to Friday 1:00 a.m. to 5:00 a.m. ET (morning drive time GMT). Finally, Bloomberg Daybreak Americas is live until 7:00 a.m. ET from New York, Boston, Washington DC and San Francisco.  Through these programs, Bloomberg Radio offers a start to the business day globally, via the Bloomberg Radio+ Mobile App and via its live stream on Bloomberg.com and the Bloomberg Terminal. During each day, the network broadcasts over 20 live interviews with economists, market analysts, and other influential newsmakers on shows such as Bloomberg Surveillance with Tom Keene and Michael McKee which airs weekday mornings from 7 a.m. to 10 a.m. ET.

Programs 

 Bloomberg Daybreak Asia with Bryan Curtis, David Ingles, Yvonne Man and Doug Krizner
 Bloomberg Daybreak Europe with Caroline Hepker , Stephen Carroll, Anna Edwards and Tom Mackenzie
 Bloomberg UK Politics 
 Bloomberg Daybreak Americas with Karen Moskow  
 Bloomberg Surveillance with Tom Keene and Jonathan Ferro
 Bloomberg Markets with Paul Sweeney and Lisa Abramowicz
 Bloomberg Businessweek with Carol Massar
 Bloomberg Daybreak Americas 
 Bloomberg Best with June Grasso and Ed Baxter
 This Week with George Stephanopoulos
 Face the Nation  
 Meet the Press

Live-to-tape programming

 Bloomberg Daybreak Weekend  
 Bloomberg Best
 Masters in Business with Barry Ritholtz
 Bloomberg Business of Sports with Michael Barr
 Bloomberg Law and Bloomberg Opinion with June Grasso

Bloomberg Radio Network
Bloomberg Radio's 24/7 programming is syndicated by Key Networks to local radio stations across the country.

The Bloomberg Radio Network is also the leading provider of short-form business news reports to radio stations around the country. The network provides live, custom business reports to major all-news radio stations including both of New York City's all-news stations, WCBS and WINS. The network provides "Bloomberg Money Minute" reports at :20 and :50 past the hour. It also provides daily specialty reports including the "Small Business Report", the "Business of Sports Report", the "Bloomberg Pursuits Report on Luxury", the "Real Estate Report", the "Green Business Report, and the "Black Business Report".

Since April 30, 2018, Bloomberg Radio content has been syndicated in Canada by Bloomberg's local partner Bell Media Radio. The company operates two business news stations branded as BNN Bloomberg Radio, which feature audio simulcasts of programs from Bell's BNN Bloomberg cable network, and other Bloomberg Radio programs. CFTE 1410 AM Vancouver was the first Canadian station to carry the format.  It was joined in 2021 by CKOC 1150 AM in Hamilton, Ontario.

These lists may not be complete.

Full time affiliates
The following stations carry the Bloomberg Radio Network all day long.

Part time affiliates
The following stations carry select Bloomberg full-length programs.

Short form reports
The following stations carry Bloomberg's short-form business reports.

References

External links
 

Radio
Franchised radio formats
Radio stations established in 1993